Grand traité d’instrumentation et d’orchestration modernes, abbreviated in English as the Treatise on Instrumentation (sometimes Treatise on Orchestration) is a technical study of Western musical instruments written by Hector Berlioz. It was first published in 1844 after being serialised in many parts prior to this date and had a chapter added by Berlioz on conducting in 1855.

In 1904, Richard Strauss was asked to update the text to include some modern instruments and added musical examples from Wagner, and in 1905 the updated Treatise with a new preface by Strauss was published in German. The 1905 edition was translated into English in 1948.

The book discusses the various technical aspects of instruments, such as chromatic range, tone quality, and limitations. An explanation of the role of particular instruments within the orchestra is also provided. The book also provides orchestral excerpts from classical scores to give examples of techniques discussed. These examples are sometimes of works by Berlioz himself, while Mozart, Wagner, Beethoven, and Gluck are also frequently cited.

Many composers studied the work closely, such as Modest Mussorgsky, Gustav Mahler, Richard Strauss, and Nikolai Rimsky-Korsakov.

Instruments discussed
Strings:
Violin
Viola
Viola d'amore
Viola da gamba
Cello
Double bass

Plucked strings:
Harp
Guitar
Mandolin

Keyboards:
Piano
Organ

Wind instruments:
Oboe
Oboe d'amore
English horn
Bassoon
Tenoroon (Bassoon Quinte)
Clarinets (including Alto and Bass clarinets)
Basset-horn
Flute (alto flute)
Piccolo
Serpent
Russian Bassoon

Brass instruments:
French horn
Valve horn
Trumpet
Cornet
Trombones
Tubas (bass tuba)
Bugle
Key bugle
Valve bugle
Ophicleide (Bass, Alto, Double-Bass)
Bombardon

Voices: (Soprano, Alto, Tenor, Bass etc.)

Percussion:
Timpani (Kettle drums)
Bells
Glockenspiel
Glass harmonica
Ancient cymbals
Bass drum
Gong
Tambourine
Side drum
Tenor drum
Triangle
Crescent

New instruments:
Saxophones
Saxhorn
Saxotrombas
Saxtubas
Concertina
Melodium organ
Octobass
Pianos and Melodiums with prolonged sounds

Other topics discussed
The orchestra: An overview of how the orchestra functions as a whole and its development throughout history.

On conducting: A brief discussion of conducting practices in Europe during Berlioz's day. Berlioz was also known as a great conductor in his time, in addition to a composer.

References

External links
 
 Excerpts from the Treatise on Instrumentation and Orchestration
  Treatise on Instrumentation and Orchestration complete, with additions by Richard Strauss, in English, on IMSLP.org
 Treatise on Instrumentation and Orchestration, English translation of the 1858 Novello edition at Google Books

Works by Hector Berlioz
Music theory
Musicology
1844 books
Literature first published in serial form
Richard Strauss
Treatises